Girolamo Zane (1495 - October 13, 1572) was a  of the Venetian fleet during the War of Cyprus.

After being sent to Costantinople as the Venetian  in 1542, in 1566 he was appointed , receiving power on March 27, 1570. The same year he commanded the Venetian fleet in the unsuccessful expedition to save Cyprus, attacked by the Ottoman Empire. In December, his request for leave was accepted. Back in Venice he was arrested for alleged failures in the management of the fleet during the mission in the East. He died in prison on October 13, 1572.

Biography
He was born in Venice in 1495, to Bernardo di Girolamo, from the so-called branch of S. Polo, and Elisabetta Morosini di Roberto, who were married in 1487. He had at least three siblings: Pietro, a canon of Treviso, Carlo, counselor in Rethymno, ; and sister Giovanna. On 31 May 1531, having returned to Venice after an adventure in Alessandria and five years spent in Damascus, where he was consul, he married Elisabetta Vitturi di Matteo, by whom he had four children: Bernardo, a senator and counselor; Matteo, ambassador; Agnes, wife of Alvise Venier di Lorenzo; and Maria, wife of Giovanni Soranzo di Francesco.

In 1542 he was sent to Constantinople as the Venetian ambassador a position he held until 1544. In that same year, he was elected captain of Padua and, in 1558, of Verona.

War of Cyprus
On March 28, 1570, the ambassador of the Ottoman sultan Selim arrived in Venice, with the request for the surrender of the island of Cyprus. This was flatly rejected by the Council, who instead prepared for war, having already put Zane in command of the fleet on March 27, 1570, Monday of Easter.

The Venetian fleet, commanded by Zane, then moved to Zara on April 3, to wait for the other galleys. During the long stop in Zara a terrible epidemic of petechial typhus broke out which decimated the crews and which was to affect the expedition in the future. On May 30, Zane was ordered to head to Corfu where he was to join Gianandrea Doria's fleet if they reached them in time. However, the  had to wait until all the galleys were available and only reached Corfu on 29 June, where there was no trace of Doria.

On 23 July the Venetian fleet headed east and, after having made stopovers in Kefalonia, Zakynthos and Modone, arrived on 4 August in Candia. The orders given to Zane required him to head immediately to Cyprus, but the captain general decided to wait until he had substituted all the rowers who died during the epidemic.

In the meantime, on 6 August, Marcantonio Colonna had arrived in Otranto with the 12 papal galleys and was awaiting the arrival of Gianandrea Doria from Messina to set sail to the east. The latter however, not completely convinced of the whole project, deliberately delayed the reunion with Colonna, which took place only on 21 August. The following day the fleet headed for Crete where it arrived on August 31.

Despite Doria's attempts to mess everything up, accusing the Venetian fleet of being in poor condition, the Holy League sailed from the port of Sitia in the night between 17 and 18 September. Alvise Bembo was sent in advance near Castelrosso. He returned with the news that the Turks had conquered Nicosia.

This news further undermined the fragile balance of the alliance and in the war council of September 22 the Venetians were unable to impose the continuation of the expedition against the Turks. The fleet withdrew that same evening to Crete and from there to Italy.

In December 1570 his request for leave was accepted and on December 13 he was replaced by Agostino Barbarigo first and then Sebastiano Venier.

The process
Returning to Venice on 11 April, Zane was arrested for alleged failures in fleet management during the mission to the East. During the trial many officers were called to testify, including Marcantonio Colonna, who always proved to be kind to the Zane claiming that he had no fault for the failed expedition. The trial lasted for a long time and, before being able to hear the sentence, Zane died in prison on October 13, 1572.

References

Bibliography 
 
 

1495 births
1572 deaths
Commanders in chief
Republic of Venice people of the Ottoman–Venetian Wars
Republic of Venice admirals
16th-century Venetian people
Prisoners and detainees of the Republic of Venice
People who died in prison custody
Baili of Constantinople